Drinabant (INN; AVE-1625) is a drug that acts as a selective CB1 receptor antagonist, which was under investigation varyingly by Sanofi-Aventis as a treatment for obesity, schizophrenia, Alzheimer's disease, Parkinson's disease, and nicotine dependence. Though initially studied as a potential treatment for a variety of different medical conditions, Sanofi-Aventis eventually narrowed down the therapeutic indications of the compound to just appetite suppression. Drinabant reached phase IIb clinical trials for this purpose in the treatment of obesity but was shortly thereafter discontinued, likely due to the observation of severe psychiatric side effects including anxiety, depression, and thoughts of suicide in patients treated with the now-withdrawn rimonabant, another CB1 antagonist that was also under development by Sanofi-Aventis. 

In late 2018, the drug was licensed by Opiant Pharmaceuticals, which intends to develop it for the treatment of acute cannabinoid overdose (ACO) as an injectable for administration in an emergency department setting. Opiant claims that ACO is most frequently linked to the ingestion of edibles containing large quantities THC and synthetic cannabinoids that are more potent and less expensive than marijuana.  Edibles, sold as brownies, cookies and candies, pose particular risks for children, who often consume these by accident. There are currently no approved treatments for ACO.

Rimonabant was also a cannabinoid developed for prescription drug use that triggered severe psychiatric side effects and was withdrawn from the market.

See also 
 Cannabinoid receptor antagonist
 Rimonabant

References 

Anorectics
Azetidines
Cannabinoids
CB1 receptor antagonists
Chlorobenzenes
Fluoroarenes
Sulfonamides